Yusuf Abdulla Yusuf Akbar Alireza (born August 1970, Bahrain) is the chief executive officer (CEO) and co-founder of ARP Global Capital, a fund based in Dubai. In addition to his time spent at Goldman Sachs where he was a partner and co-head of the Asia-Pacific region, he also served as CEO of Noble Group, the Hong Kong energy conglomerate, and a Fortune Global 500 company, before resigning in May 2016.

Education
Yusuf Alireza received a joint master's and bachelor's degree from the Edmund A. Walsh School of Foreign Service at Georgetown University. He completed his bachelor's studies in International Economics, pursuing a master's degree in International Relations and affairs.

Career
Alireza spent 20 years at Goldman Sachs, ultimately becoming co-president of Asia operations, excluding Japan, and a member of the firm's global management committee. He began working at Goldman Sachs New York in 1992, in the Fixed Income Industry Research Group, before transferring to the firm's London office in 1997 and becoming the Head of Europe, the Middle East, and Africa (EMEA) sales and structuring efforts.

He was made a partner in 2004, and relocated to Hong Kong in 2008, where he managed the Asia Pacific securities division of Goldman Sachs.

Alireza was made co-head of the Asia-Pacific region in January 2011, ex Japan. He spent 11 months in the position before resigning in November 2011.

Alireza became CEO of Noble Group in April 2012, succeeding Ricardo Leiman as the head of the Hong Kong-based global supply chain manager of energy and agricultural products. Alireza transitioned the company to an asset-light model and sold the firm's Noble Agri business to the Chinese company Cofco Corp in 2014. Alireza resigned in May 2016 after Noble's share price fell by 76%.

In 2015, an anonymous research blog, Iceberg Research, started to question the accounting practices of Noble Group. Though the author was initially not confirmed, Alireza published an open letter identifying Arnaud Vagner, a former Noble credit analyst who had been fired in 2013, allegedly for poor performance. In 2018 Vagner confirmed that he was the blog’s author. The blog claimed that the company booked profits on long term contracts. Noble hired PricewaterhouseCoopers, who announced that the accounting methods complied with international accounting rules, though they also advised that the trader needed to improve their governance and methodology.  A probe was launched into Noble Group's accounting in Singapore three years later in November 2018, two years after Alireza's departure, and Noble is suing Vagner.

Alireza also sits on various boards, including Bahrain's Economic Development Board, the National Bank of Bahrain, the Bahrain Ship Repairing and Engineering Company, Room to Read, and the Georgetown Center for Contemporary Arab Studies.

References

1970 births
Living people
Walsh School of Foreign Service alumni
Bahraini businesspeople